Sensory integration therapy (SIT) was originally developed by occupational therapist A. Jean Ayres in the 1970s to help children with sensory-processing difficulties. It was specifically designed to treat Sensory Processing Disorder (sometimes called Sensory Integrative Dysfunction). Sensory Integration Therapy is based on A. Jean Ayres's Sensory Integration Theory, which proposes that sensory-processing is linked to emotional regulation, learning, behavior, and participation in daily life. Sensory integration is the process of organizing sensations from the body and from environmental stimuli.

Theoretical concept 
A. Jean Ayres' sensory integration theory describes the following:

 How the neurological process of processing and integrating sensory information from the body and the environment contribute to emotional regulation, learning, behavior, and participation in daily life.
 Empirically derived disorders of sensory integration.
 Intervention approaches and strategies for sensory input.

Sensory integration theory is used to explain why individuals behave in particular ways, plan intervention to ameliorate particular difficulties, and predict how behavior will change as a result of intervention. Dr. Ayres defines sensory integration as the organization of an individual's senses for use. The brain must organize all of sensations if a person is to move, learn, and behave in a productive manner.

Individuals with sensory-processing difficulties often experience delayed or impeded typical behaviors and functioning as a result of interferences in neurological processing and integration of sensory inputs. Sensory dysfunction affects the neurological processing of sensory information and sensory systems which causes negative impacts on learning and development. ASI highlights the critical influence that sensory-processing has on a child's growth and development. It contributes to the understanding of how sensation affects learning, social-emotional development, and neurophysiological processes, such as motor performance, attention, and arousal.

ASI has been studied by different professions on diverse levels, such as by occupational therapists and researchers as a foundation for occupational performance and participation, and by psychologists on a cellular level as multi-sensory integration.

As an intervention approach, it is used as "a clinical frame of reference for the assessment and treatment of people who have functional disorders in sensory processing".

Practice 
Individuals with sensory processing disorder or sensory integrative dysfunction experience problems with their sensory systems, also known as basic senses of touch, smell, hearing, taste, sight, body coordination, and movement against gravity. They might also experience difficulties in movement, coordination, and sensing where one's body is in a given space. ASI focuses on three main sensory systems - vestibular, proprioceptive, and tactile. Each individual sensory system has specific receptors or cells within the body that deliver messages to the brain. These receptors are located in specific parts of the body - gustatory/taste (mouth), olfactory/smell (nose), visual (eye), auditory (ear), and vestibular (inner ear). Other receptors are spread throughout the body - tactile (skin) and proprioception (muscles and joints).  

Sensory Integration Therapy, also known as sensory-based treatments or interventions, are designed to provide sensory activities or experiences to help individuals respond better to environmental stimuli (i.e., sensory input). The main goal and priority for the use of sensory integration therapies is to improve internal sensory processing, improve self-regulation, develop adaptive functioning   skills, and to help the child successfully become participate in daily life experiences and activities.  Sensory-based interventions or activities are structured and individualized per each child's specific individual needs. They range from passive activities (i.e., wearing a weighted vest, weighted blank, receiving hugs, playing with shaving cream) to active activities (i.e., spinning around, jumping on trampoline, running, climbing, walking on patterned blocks). 

According to proponents of sensory integration therapy, sensory integrative dysfunction is a common disorder for individuals with neurological learning disabilities such as an autism spectrum disorder, attention deficit hyperactivity disorder, and sensory modulation dysfunction.

Sensory overload examples

Visual 

 Covers eyes when lights are too bright
 Stares at bright, fluorescent, or flickering lights
 Stares at spinning objects
 Holds items extremely close to eyes or face
 Turns opposite direction or away from where teacher is lecturing
 Easily distracted by extremely organized or unorganized rooms
 Lack of eye contact or looks beyond person's face
 Overwhelmed by too many colors, materials, or pictures in room
 Turns or tilts head when reading across a page

Auditory 

 Covers ears when loud noises occur (i.e., fire drill, yelling, alarms)
 Runs away from loud areas
 Hums or sings to themself
 Complains of noises inside room or outside of window
 Covers ears in the cafeteria or in bathroom
 Runs when toilet flushes
 Prefers very loud music or no music at all

Tactile 

 Avoids touching certain surfaces or textures 
 Prefers to touch specific fabrics or textures
 Touches everything in sight 
 Doesn't react to pain 
 Might bite or suck on their own skin
 Doesn't react to or overreacts to extreme temperatures (i.e., wears shorts when extremely cold)
 Dislikes getting hands and feet dirty, wet, in sand, or in paint. 
 Avoids getting hair, face, or head touched.

Gustatory (Taste) 

 Refuses to eat or gags on certain foods  
 Eats extreme tasting foods (i.e., lemons, hot sauce, lots of salt or pepper)
 Sensitive to hot or cold foods
 Licks, tastes, or tries to eat play dough, objects, or toys

Olfactory (Smell) 

 Might smell everything they touch
 Sensitive to odors (i.e., perfume, air fresheners, essential oils)
 Might not smell or recognize bad odors
 Sniffs other people
 Breathes through their mouths instead of nose

Vestibular 

 Might seem like a "thrill seeker" (i.e., jumping from high places, climbing furniture, running extremely fast)
 Difficulties with sitting or remaining still
 Prefers to lie down instead of sitting up
 Enjoys being upside down 
 Easily loses balance when walking, going up and down the stairs, or standing
 Rocks back and forth

Proprioceptive 

 Touches walls while walking
 Stands too close when talking to others
 Chews, pulls, or twists items (i.e., pencils, shirt, toys, hand or arm)
 Accidentally leans, trips, crashes, or bumps into objects or people
 Deliberately falls or crashes into things
 Walks stiff and uncoordinated
 Pulls fingers or cracks knuckles constantly
 Frequently breaks toys or objects

Sensory activity examples

Visual 

 Spinning tops or toys
 Light up toys
 Use a flashlight or pen light to draw attention
 Visual memory games
 Colored chalk, markers, crayons, and pencils
 Lava lamps
 Bubbles
 Look in mirror
 Coloring mixing activities
 Light table
 Shadow exploration 
 Parachute play

Auditory 

 Incorporate music during activities
 Noise cancelling headphones
 Background noise, white noise, or sound machine
 Books, puzzles, toys, or manipulatives with sound
 Bubble wrap
 Snap, clap, or stomp
 Play with music instrument
 Kazoo toy
 Listen to nature sounds outside (i.e., birds, ducks, dogs)

Tactile 

 Play dough
 Sensory bin with rice, beans, cereal, or waterbeads
 Theraputty 
 Sand or water play
 Lotion massage rub to hands and arms
 Fidget toys
 Scratchy gloves, sand paper, cotton balls, brushes
 Finger writing or hand play with shaving cream or whipped cream 
 Finger paint
 Bubble wrap 
 Felt strips
 Textured foam paper
 Carpet samples
 Play dress up and practice zipping, buttoning, snapping, tying or looping laces

Gustatory (Taste) 

 Mouth and chewing toys
 Vibrating toys
 Vibrating toothbrush
 Sour, salty, crunchy,  snacks
 Drink warm or cold liquids
 Variety of straw types (i.e., hard, soft, rubber, textured)

Olfactory (Smell) 

Lotion with calming or alerting aromas
Scented soaps to wash hands
Essential oils diffuser, necklaces, bracelets
Scented markers or stickers (non-toxic)
Scented play dough, finger paints, or sensory dough
Scented bubbles
Create scented bottles with aromas, spices, or oils

Vestibular 

 Rocking chair
 Spinning
 Twirling
 Bend over and place head below heart
 Fast, alternating movements
 Ride tricycles, scooter boards, or scooters
 Jumping jumps
 Bounce and roll on therapy ball - slow or fast 
 Therapy ball chair
 Sit N Spin
 Take a longer route to and from class 
 Vibration toys

Proprioceptive 

 Playground - climb, hang, run through, and go under equipment
 Sand play - dig or pour
 Jump on trampoline 
 Jumping or running in place
 Theraputty exercises 
 Stand up to do work
 Chair or wall push ups
 Obstacle course 
 Bear or crab walk
 Yoga poses
 Push or carry a heavy box around the room
 Carry weighted backpack 
 Body sox play
 Arm circles
 Sit ups
 Wheelbarrow walking

Evidence and Effectiveness 
While sensory-based interventions are highly advocated for, there continues to be a lack of empirical support. There is disagreement over their therapeutic worth, largely due to problems with methodology and confusion of terms and conflation with similar and related approaches.

Ayres' theory of sensory integration is frequently critiqued. Emerging evidence with improved methodology, the development of a Fidelity Measure and increasing focus of resources on areas of practice that might not typically attract medical research funding, means that the much needed evidence for Ayres SI is now emerging.

Hume and colleagues support the use of Ayres’ Sensory Integration (ASI), making the case for why review of science and evidence should be ongoing.The current report updates and extends the work on evidence-based, focused intervention practices begun with an initial review of the literature from 1997 to 2007 (Odom et al. 2010a, b) and extended through a second report that covered the literature from 1990 to 2011 (Wong et al. 2015); extending this systematic review through 2017 added 567 articles to the review. As the intervention literature has provided more empirical information and as practices have evolved, some of the classifications required reconceptualization and revision of previous definitions. In an active research area, knowledge does not stand still, and in fact, identification of EBPs should be dynamic, reflecting the growth of knowledge across time (Biglan and Ogden 2019).In their article they clearly state the importance of clearly defining what sensory integration therapy is and what it is not; helping to clarify and delineate the clinical practice reported in their article, from other related approaches based on Ayres SI theory. It is important to note that Sensory Integration refers explicitly to the classical sensory integration model developed by Jean Ayres (2005) and not to a variety of interventions that address sensory issues but have been found to be unsupported (Case-Smith et al. 2015; Watling and Hauer 2015).

History
In the 1950s, Dr. A. Jean Ayres, an occupational therapist and psychologist, developed the theory and framework of sensory integration. Her book Sensory Integration and the Child, first published in the 1970s, was a means of helping families, therapists, and educators of children with sensory-processing difficulties and sensory processing disorders to better organize and improve self-regulation of body and environmental sensory inputs.

Ayres' approach has proliferated among therapy and educational professionals over the past several decades. It has been met with some resistance within the occupational therapy profession and in other disciplines.

See also
Multisensory integration
Music therapy
Occupational science
Occupational therapy
Sensory processing
Sensory overload
Sensory Processing Disorder Foundation

References

Therapy
Occupational therapy
Alternative therapies for developmental and learning disabilities